Louis I, Count of Erbach-Erbach (3 September 1579 – 12 April 1643), was a German prince member of the House of Erbach and ruler over Erbach, Freienstein, Michelstadt, Bad König and Wildenstein.

Born in Erbach, he was the seventh child and third (but second surviving) son of George III, Count of Erbach-Breuberg and his second wife Anna, a daughter of Frederick Magnus, Count of Solms-Laubach-Sonnenwalde.

Life

After the death of their father, Louis I and his surviving brothers divided the Erbach domains in 1606: he received the districts of Erbach and Freienstein.

When their older brother Frederick Magnus died in 1618 without surviving male issue, the brothers divided his domains among them, but this took place only in 1623, when Louis I received Michelstadt and Bad König. In 1627, the death of another of the brother, John Casimir, unmarried and childless, caused another division of the paternal inheritance: this time, Louis I received Wildenstein.

Louis died in Erbach aged 63 and was buried in Michelstadt. Because he died without surviving male issue, his only remaining brother, George Albert I inherited his domains, and with this reunited all the Erbach family lands.

Notes

Counts of Germany
House of Erbach
1579 births
1643 deaths
17th-century German people